Daniel Keating may refer to:

Dan Keating
Daniel Keating (Medal of Honor)
Daniel Keating, character in NCIS (season 6)

See also
Daniel Keatings